Vadim Crîcimari (born 22 August 1988) is a Moldovan footballer who plays as a forward for Dacia Buiucani.

Career
At the end of July 2021, Crîcimari joined Oțelul Galați.

Honours
2011–12 Moldovan Cup - Runner Up

Oțelul Galați
Liga III: 2021–22

References

External links

Profile at Divizia Nationala

1988 births
Footballers from Chișinău
Moldovan footballers
Moldovan expatriate footballers
Living people
Association football forwards
FC Sfîntul Gheorghe players
FK Mughan players
FC Rapid Ghidighici players
FC Speranța Crihana Veche players
FC Zimbru Chișinău players
FC Tosno players
FC SKA-Khabarovsk players
FC Academia Chișinău players
FC Dinamo-Auto Tiraspol players
Speranța Nisporeni players
FC Codru Lozova players
FC Florești players
Dacia Buiucani players
ASC Oțelul Galați players
Moldovan Super Liga players
Azerbaijan Premier League players
Russian First League players
Liga III players
Moldovan expatriate sportspeople in Russia
Moldovan expatriate sportspeople in Azerbaijan
Moldovan expatriate sportspeople in Romania
Expatriate footballers in Russia
Expatriate footballers in Azerbaijan
Expatriate footballers in Romania